It's All in the Movies is the nineteenth studio album by American country singer Merle Haggard and The Strangers, released in 1976.

History
The album's title track became Haggard's eighth consecutive #1 country single and features the same pop-oriented sound that producer Ken Nelson had employed on the singer's recent chart topper "Always Wanting You." Two songs, "Stingeree" and "Hag's Dixie Blues, No. 2," had been recorded for a 1973 studio album I Love Dixie Blues, a project Haggard scrapped after deciding to record a live album in New Orleans. Haggard also returns to Bob Wills and western swing on "Living With the Shades Pulled Down" and Wills own "Cotton Patch Blues." The album closes with the Dolly Parton-penned gospel song "The Seeker."

Reception
It's All in the Movies would become Haggard's third consecutive collection to top the Billboard country albums chart.  AllMusic:  "While the title track is a gentle, affecting ballad, It's All in the Movies doesn't contain enough similarly engaging material to make the record successful. The album is at its best when Haggard delves into western swing, such as 'Living with the Shades Pulled Down,' or when he delivers straightforward ballads like 'Nothing's Worse Than Losing' and 'I Know An Ending When It Comes,' but too many of the songs on the LP are pleasant, but inconsequential, filler."

Track listing
All tracks composed by Merle Haggard; except where indicated
"It's All in the Movies" – 3:15
"Nothing's Worse Than Losing" – 2:58
"After Loving You" (Merle Haggard, Ronnie Reno, Leona Williams) – 3:10
"Stingeree" (Charles Singleton, Larry Coleman) – 4:03
"I Know an Ending When It Comes" (Hank Cochran) – 3:10
"This Is the Song We Sing" – 2:45
"Living With the Shades Pulled Down" – 2:58
"Hag's Dixie Blues, No. 2" – 2:50
"Let's Stop Pretending" – 3:05
"Cotton Patch Blues" (Bob Wills, Tiny Moore, Billy Joe Moore) – 2:57
"The Seeker" (Dolly Parton) – 2:50

Personnel
Merle Haggard– vocals, guitar

The Strangers:
Roy Nichols – lead guitar
Norman Hamlet – steel guitar, dobro
 Tiny Moore – mandolin
Eldon Shamblin– guitar
 Ronnie Reno – guitar
 Mark Yeary – piano
 James Tittle – bass
Biff Adam – drums
Don Markham – saxophone

with
 Bobby Wayne – guitar
 Marcia Nichols – guitar
 Dave Kirby – guitar
 Dennis Hromek – bass
 Johnny Gimble – fiddle
 Bonnie Owens – harmony vocals

and
Hargus "Pig" Robbins – piano, organ
Glen D. Hardin – piano
Chuck Berghofer – bass
 Bob Moore – bass
 Joseph Zinkan – bass
 Bill Puett – horns

Chart positions

References

1976 albums
Merle Haggard albums
Capitol Records albums
Albums produced by Ken Nelson (United States record producer)